Martin Wendt is a Danish professional poker player.

In the 2005 Poker Million, Wendt was at one time the chip leader, but ended up finishing in 3rd place, earning $200,000. 

In 2007, he won the second William Hill Poker Grand Prix, earning £175,000 ($342,707).

Wendt also captained the Danish team in the Poker Nations Cup.

As of 2009, his total live tournament winnings exceed $900,000.

Notes

Danish poker players
Living people
Year of birth missing (living people)